NMV may refer to:

 National Museum Victoria (code NMV)

New Millenium Version
Nutan Marathi Vidyalaya
Netherlands Malacological Society
Narcissus mosaic virus plant pathogenic virus in the genus Potexvirus and family Alphaflexiviridae, which infects Narcissus